John Wartique (born 25 June 1990 in Horion-Hozémont) is a racing driver from Belgium. He currently competes in the European Ferrari Challenge having previously raced in the GP3 Series.

Racing record

Career summary

Complete GP3 Series results
(key) (Races in bold indicate pole position) (Races in italics indicate fastest lap)

Ferrari Challenge Finali Mondiali results

Complete 24 Hours of Spa results

References

External links
 Profile at Driver Database

Belgian racing drivers
1990 births
Living people
GP3 Series drivers
Porsche Supercup drivers
People from Grâce-Hollogne
Sportspeople from Liège Province

AF Corse drivers
CRS Racing drivers
21st-century Belgian people
Ferrari Challenge drivers